Tori Tsui is a Hong Kong climate justice activist and writer who currently resides in Bristol, England.

Early life and education 
Tsui was born in New Zealand and grew up in Hong Kong.

She graduated in 2015 with a Master of Research in Ecology, Evolution and Conservation at  Imperial College London. A year after graduating, Tsui moved to Bristol to work in the natural history documentary industry.

Activism 
Tsui was involved initially in extinction rebellion and after creating media on the biodiversity crisis the creative director of Stella McCartney invited Tsui to be part of McCartney's global fall/winter campaign. The campaign, entitled ‘Agents of Change’,  featured Jane Goodall, Amber Valletta and Jonathan Safran Foer.

McCartney subsequently sponsored Tsui to sail across the Atlantic to COP25 as part of Sail To The COP - a think tank initiative involving 36 youths to attend the 2019 United Nations Climate Change Conference in Santiago, Chile. Due to civil unrest in Chile, the event was relocated to Madrid. While in Martinique, the delegates worked remotely on COP25.  The ship finally docked in Cartagena.

While in Colombia, Tsui spent three months facilitating a new project called Sail for Climate Action. The project's purpose was to bring Latin American, Indigenous and Caribbean youth activists to attend the United Nations Climate Change Intersessional SB52 in Bonn, Germany.
In Cartagena, Tsui was invited to replace David Wallace-Wells at the Hay Festival in a panel discussion on climate change.

Later, Sail for Climate Action was rebranded to Unite for Climate Action. The project collaborated with the German Ministry in 2020.

In 2021, Tsui launched the Pass the Mic initiative with Dominique Palmer, Frances Fox, George Steedman Jones and Elijah Mckenzie-Jackson called Pass the Mic as a way to shed light on the climate crisis. The campaign was focused on targeting brands, figures and organisation to give the frontline climate activist and people affected by the climate change.

Tsui has also spoken out on the #StopCambo Campaign against North Sea oil and gas in decision making spaces, leading a protest against Ben Van Beurden at TED Countdown in Edinburgh. Later that year she attended the 2021 United Nations Climate Change Conference. Emma Watson invited Tsui to participate in a New York Times climate hub event alongside Amanda Gorman, Malala Yousafzai, Greta Thunberg, Vanessa Nakate, Dominique Palmer, Mya-Rose Craig, Viviam Villafana and Daphne Frias.

In 2022, Tsui featured in the Billie Eilish documentary on climate change alongside Billie Eilish, Maggie Baird, Finneas O'Connell,Vivienne Westwood, Vanessa Nakate and Yungblud.

In January 2023, Tsui was invited to be on the digital front cover of Vogue with Billie Eilish and Quannah Chasinghorse, Xiye Bastida, Isaias Hernandez, Ryan Berberet, Nalleli Cobo, Wawa Gatheru and Maya Penn.

It's Not Just You 
Tsui released her debut book with Simon and Schuster titled 'It's Not Just You' which explores eco-anxiety from an intersectional and climate justice lens. The book features interviews from Greta Thunberg, Vanessa Nakate, Mikaela Loach and Dominique Palmer.

References 

Living people
Year of birth missing (living people)
Climate activists
Women environmentalists
Alumni of Imperial College London
Hong Kong emigrants to England
People from Bristol